Kiwi onion dip is a type of dipping sauce eaten in New Zealand. Often referred to as 'kiwi dip', 'onion dip' or 'original kiwi dip', it consists of a packet of powdered onion soup stirred into a can of reduced cream, which is then left to refrigerate and thicken, and is often then garnished with lemon juice and sometimes parsley. "Kiwi" refers to this being a New Zealand dish as opposed to the dip containing kiwifruit nor any kiwi (bird) products. Served alongside potato chips, crackers, or chopped vegetables, the dip is a popular dish at parties, barbeques, and other social occasions. A small amount of vinegar or lemon juice can be added to the dip for flavour.

Kiwi onion dip's creation has been credited to Rosemary Dempsey, a home economist for Nestlé New Zealand in the 1950s or 60s.

In popular culture 
The dip has assumed an iconic status in New Zealand cuisine.  In February 2019 Nestlé released a campaign bannered "Kiwi as", aligning the dip with canonical moments in New Zealand popular culture. Lauraine Jacobs, a food writer, has said Kiwi onion dip is an “all-time classic”. “My mother made it. My son and his wife make it, and think themselves clever. So now it is the darling of yet another generation." The dip is often missed by New Zealanders living abroad who may not have access to reduced cream, a dairy product only widely available in their home country. In 2019 it was reported cans of reduced cream are commonly found in the suitcases of New Zealanders as they travel overseas.

In April 2019, Countdown supermarket announced the introduction of 'NZ Onion Dip Icecream', a two litre tub of ice cream flavoured with caramelised onions and reduced cream. The product was later declared by the supermarket to be an April Fools' joke.

See also

 French onion dip
 List of dips

References 

New Zealand cuisine
Dips (food)